Shiwei is a sum (a type of township-level division) under the administration of Ergun City, Inner Mongolia. The township is located in Northeastern Inner Mongolia on the border with Russia.

The township is one of the border crossings between China and Russia, lying on one side of the Ergune River. On the opposite bank lies the Russian village of Olochi, connected to Shiwei by the Friendship Bridge.

Demographics

Shiwei is notable for being home to descendants of ethnic Russians, one of China's smallest minorities.  (Russians are among the 56 nationalities officially recognized in China.) They mostly live in the neighboring township of Enhe (恩和俄羅斯族鄉), which since 2011 has split from Shiwei to become an ethnic township. 

Ethnic Russians first arrived in large numbers in Manchuria during the 1890s as colonists. Marriages between Russian women and Han Chinese men in the towns and villages of the frontier areas along the Ergun River like Shiwei emerged in the 1890s, at the same time of the first wave of Russian settlement. Interracial marriages between Chinese women and Russian men were rare, a marriage pattern that does not fit the colonial convention of Western men marrying native women.

Economy
Shiwei serves as a border crossing between China and Russia. A Friendship Bridge was built following a joint agreement between Russia and China to construct it in 2001, an outcome of the 1991 Sino-Soviet Border Agreement, a treaty on resolving most of the border disputes between the two states. Social anthropologist Ed Pulford has described the Friendship Bridge, which allows no passenger traffic and primarily serves as a crossing for trucks carrying quarried stone into China, as an example of how "even the most fervent attempts to forge cross-border linkages can become almost comically ineffective" when it comes to Russian–Chinese relations.

Education 
There is one school: Ergun City Shiwei Primary School (额尔古纳市室韦小学).

Tourism
Domestic tourists on package tours stop in Shiwei to view the Russian side from a viewing platform on the riverbank on the Chinese side of the Friendship Bridge. The central square of Shiwei offers nighttime entertainment in the form of neon lights, techno music, and an atmosphere of revelry.

Along with neighboring Enhe, Shiwei is marketed as a tourist destination to experience a "Russian town" in China. Since being listed in 2005 by CCTV as one of the "top ten most beautiful townships in China", Shiwei has seen an influx of tourists. However, domestic media and tour operators have given more weight to Enhe as the place to experience a "Russian village".

References

Township-level divisions of Inner Mongolia
Ergun City